The 1999 Amsterdam Admirals season was the fifth season for the franchise in the NFL Europe League (NFLEL). The team was led by head coach Al Luginbill in his fifth year, and played its home games at Amsterdam ArenA in Amsterdam, Netherlands. They finished the regular season in fourth place with a record of four wins and six losses.

Offseason

NFL Europe League draft

Personnel

Staff

Roster

Schedule

Standings

Game summaries

Week 1: at Barcelona Dragons

Week 2: vs Frankfurt Galaxy

Week 3: at Rhein Fire

Week 4: vs Berlin Thunder

Week 5: at Berlin Thunder

Week 6: vs Rhein Fire

Week 7: vs Barcelona Dragons

Week 8: at Frankfurt Galaxy

Week 9: at Scottish Claymores

Week 10: vs Scottish Claymores

Notes

References

Amsterdam Admirals seasons